Vitthal Udyognagar is a town and Vitthal Udyognagar INA is a co-extensive industrial notified area in Anand district in the Indian state of Gujarat.

Demographics
 India census, Vitthal Udyognagar had a population of 4,103. Males constitute 53% of the population and females 47%. Vitthal Udyognagar had an average literacy rate of 70%, higher than the national average of 59.5%: male literacy was 78%, and female literacy was 60%. In Vitthal Udyognagar, 14% of the population was under 6 years of age.

Notes and references

Cities and towns in Anand district